Magen David Sephardic Congregation (MDSC) is a Modern Orthodox Sephardi synagogue located in North Bethesda, Maryland.

History
The first Sephardi Jews began to immigrate to Washington, D.C. in the 1910s and 1920s. Most early Sephardi immigrants to DC were from Turkey and Greece. By the 1940s, Moroccan Jews began to immigrate to DC, followed by immigrants from Algeria, Egypt, Iraq, Iran, Libya, Lebanon, Syria, Tunisia, and elsewhere. By 1966, these immigrants and their descendants had formed a board of directors for what would become Magen David Sephardic Congregation and a charter was enacted. Due to a lack of a permanent space, the congregation was hosted by a variety of Ashkenazi congregations. The early years of the congregation had a heavily Moroccan style, but gradually began to adopt a more broadly North African and Middle Eastern style as other immigrants joined. Magen David welcomed Ashkenazi visitors and members and embraced European influences, but maintained its Sephardi traditions.

During the 1980s the congregation met at Tifereth Israel, a Conservative synagogue in Washington, D.C. Later, services were held at Ohr Kodesh, a Conservative synagogue in Chevy Chase. By 1984, the congregation had purchased a building in Rockville and by 1987 they had their first Rabbi. Due to surging membership, the congrgation needed a larger space. By 1998, prayers were being held in a new synagogue that was built in North Bethesda.

The congregation is affiliated with the Orthodox Union.

References

External links
Magen David Sephardic Congregation, official website

Algerian-American history
Algerian-Jewish diaspora
Egyptian-Jewish culture in the United States
Greek-Jewish culture in the United States
Iranian-Jewish culture in the United States
Iraqi diaspora
Iraqi-Jewish diaspora
Lebanese-Jewish culture in the United States
Libyan diaspora
Libyan-Jewish diaspora
Mizrahi Jewish culture in the United States
Modern Orthodox Judaism in Maryland
Modern Orthodox synagogues in the United States
Moroccan-American history
Moroccan-Jewish diaspora
Orthodox synagogues in Maryland
North Bethesda, Maryland
Sephardi Jewish culture in Maryland
Sephardi Conservative Judaism
Tunisian diaspora
Tunisian-Jewish diaspora
Turkish-Jewish culture in the United States
Synagogues in Montgomery County, Maryland
Syrian-Jewish culture in the United States